Oberurnen is a former municipality in the canton of Glarus in Switzerland. Effective from 1 January 2011, Oberurnen is part of the municipality of Glarus Nord.

History
Oberurnen is first mentioned in 1340 as Obern Urannen.

Geography
Of this area, 45.2% is used for agricultural purposes, while 40.6% is forested. Of the rest of the land, 4.1% is settled (buildings or roads) and the remainder (10.2%) is non-productive (rivers, glaciers or mountains).

Oberurnen is located in the Glarner Unterland.

Demographics

Oberurnen has a population (as of 2010) of 1,963.  , 24.2% of the population was made up of foreign nationals.  Over the last 10 years the population has grown at a rate of 0.5%.  Most of the population speaks German  (79.8%), with Italian being second most common ( 8.2%) and Albanian being third ( 3.6%).

In the 2007 federal election the most popular party was the SPS which received 44.9% of the vote.  Most of the rest of the votes went to the SVP with 44.2% of the vote.

In Oberurnen about 56.9% of the population (between age 25-64) have completed either non-mandatory upper secondary education or additional higher education (either University or a Fachhochschule).

Oberurnen has an unemployment rate of 2.46%.  , there were 53 people employed in the primary economic sector and about 21 businesses involved in this sector.  82 people are employed in the secondary sector and there are 19 businesses in this sector.  129 people are employed in the tertiary sector, with 42 businesses in this sector.

The historical population is given in the following table:

Transport
Nieder- und Oberurnen railway station is on the Weesen to Linthal railway line. It is served by the Zürich S-Bahn service S25 between Linthal and Zurich, and by the St. Gallen S-Bahn service S6 between Rapperswil and Schwanden. Both services operate once per hour, combining to provide two trains per hour between Ziegelbrücke and Schwanden.

References

Former municipalities of the canton of Glarus